Guérin-Kouka (or Kouka) is a city in Togo with 13,200 inhabitants (2004). It is the seat of Dankpen prefecture in Kara Region.

Populated places in Kara Region